Polypedates cruciger (commonly known as the Sri Lanka whipping frog or common hour-glass tree-frog) is a species of frog in the family Rhacophoridae endemic to Sri Lanka.

Its natural habitats are subtropical or tropical dry forests, subtropical or tropical moist lowland forests, subtropical or tropical moist montane forests, freshwater marshes, intermittent freshwater marshes, pastureland, plantations, rural gardens, urban areas, heavily degraded former forest, and ponds.

References 

Frogs of Sri Lanka
cruciger
Amphibians described in 1852
Taxa named by Edward Blyth
Taxonomy articles created by Polbot